Charles Hubert Itandje (born 2 November 1982) is a retired professional footballer who played as a goalkeeper. Born in France, Itandje represented the Cameroon national team.

Club career

Lens

Born in Bobigny (a suburb of Paris) of Cameroonian descent, Itandje began his professional career at French club RC Lens in 2001, for whom he made 170 league appearances and 21 appearances in European games. Lens were prepared to allow Itandje to leave for Liverpool after they signed two goalkeepers in the summer of 2007, saying: "The directors of Lens have concluded the definitive sale of Charles Itandje to Liverpool Football Club. The Lens goalkeeper leaves Lens after six years of good and loyal service."

Liverpool
Itandje signed for Liverpool in August 2007, as cover for Pepe Reina, thus allowing Scott Carson to join Aston Villa on a season-long loan to play regularly. Itandje said of his move: "At Liverpool there is a very good keeper who has been there three years. I am clearly going to be number 2. But, there are 60 matches a season and it is planned that I will play the League Cup and FA Cup." He made his first team debut for Liverpool in a League Cup match against Reading on 25 September, which Liverpool won 4–2, and in total, made three League Cup appearances and four FA Cup appearances for Liverpool in the 2007–08 season.

He was made available for transfer in the summer of 2008 after Liverpool signed Diego Cavalieri but turned down a move to Galatasaray. He made no further appearances for Liverpool and by January 2009 was seeking to leave the club.

On 30 June 2010, Itandje returned to Liverpool. His contract with Liverpool was due to expire in January 2011 and he was at least fifth in the goalkeeping order, behind Pepe Reina, Brad Jones, Péter Gulácsi and Martin Hansen. Upon his return, he was criticised by John Aldridge for "collecting his wages" rather than looking for a different club where he would have a chance of playing. In total for Liverpool, Itandje played 7 times.

Hillsborough memorial incident
After the memorial service for the twentieth anniversary of the Hillsborough disaster in April 2009, complaints were made by members of the congregation that Itandje had been laughing and behaving inappropriately during the service. His actions were condemned by the Liverpool hierarchy, who stated that they would be seeking to impose the maximum punishment possible. Itandje apologised to the grieving families and to Liverpool fans for his behaviour and was suspended by the club for 14 days. He did not play another game, at reserve or first team level, for the club.

In an exclusive interview with Le Journal du Dimanche, Itandje spoke out about the Hillsborough incident for the first time. He said when he saw himself laughing on television, he described this as "awkward and unwelcome." As a result of this, Itandje stated the club never supported him for this and the club supporters started to threaten him saying: "Do not walk in the street, you'll get mugged." His increasing stress caused him to have eczema on his hand.

Following his move to Atromitos, Itandje apologised emphatically:

Kavala and Atromitos
On 29 August 2009, Itandje moved on loan at Kavala for the whole of the season despite interests from La Liga side Málaga and Sporting de Gijón. Upon joining Kavala, Itandje says joining the club describes the experience as "exotic in a fairly ambitious club" and "unlike anything I have experienced" club. There is no fitness center, no training center. After being a second choice goalkeeper, Itandje managed to beat off competitions from veteran goalkeeper Željko Kalac to become a first choice goalkeeper. Itandje went on to make 19 appearances for Kavala and Itandje also made 9 clean sheets for the club.

On 8 December 2010, it was announced that Itandje would be leaving Liverpool, being released from his contract. He joined Greek club Atromitos on a free transfer on 1 January 2011. Upon his departure from Liverpool, Newspaper Liverpool Echo were relieved of finally getting rid of Itandje. Since joining Greece permanently, Itandje have become the first choice goalkeeper throughout his Atromitos career.
 
He started the Greek Cup final for Atromitos who lost 3–0 to AEK at the OAKA stadium in Athens and also started in another Greek Cup final for Atromitos, which they lost 2–1 to Olympiacos at the OAKA stadium in Athens for the second time, which Atromitos played in. Despite losing the Greek Cup, Itandje, nevertheless, helped the club reach fifth place, which resulted in a qualification in the Europa League. In the Europa League Qualification Round against Newcastle United, Itandje played in both legs, as Newcastle United win 2–1 on aggregate, thus putting Atromitos out of the Europa League.

During his time at Atromitos, Itandje credited Giorgos Donis on helping him, quoting: "I am very proud that my coach says very good things about me. For this I came to the group. O Donis brought me much because he believed in me and told me to come in Atromitos."

PAOK
On 29 January 2013, Itandje signed a two-year contract with PAOK, where he will be wearing number 27 shirt, as well as, rejoining Donis.

On 10 July 2013, he signed a one-year contract on loan with Turkish side Konyaspor from PAOK. He made his debut, in the opening game of the season, in a 3–2 win over Fenerbahçe. He became the first choice goalkeeper throughout the season at Konyaspor and kept nine clean sheets in 39 appearances.

He returned to PAOK after his loan to Konyaspor and during the second half of the 2014–15 season became the first choice goalkeeper helping the club to improve its performance, especially after the advent of the new coach, Georgios Charalambous Georgiadis.

Versailles
On 17 August 2018, it was reported that Itandje had signed for National 3 side Versailles.

International career

Itandje has represented France on several occasions, making his debut against Yugoslavia in November 2002.

In 2006, he was called up for pre-selection for the French squad after a fine season at RC Lens. He was selected for the équipe de France espoirs (the under-21 team), and became known for his dance to destabilize opponents during the penalty shootout.

In October 2010 he was cleared by FIFA to represent Cameroon after expressing his desire to play for the Cameroon national team.

Itandje made his international debut in the World Cup Qualifier against Togo and soon made himself the number 1 choice. He then went on to play in Cameroon's opening game in the World Cup against Mexico. He then continued in their following two games against Croatia and Brazil. Cameroon lost all of these games, resulting in them being knocked out of the World Cup at the group stage.

Career statistics

A.  Includes appearances in the Greek Cup and FA Cup.
B.  Includes appearances in the UEFA Europa League.
C.  Includes appearances in the League Cup and Superleague Greece play-offs.

Honours
UEFA Intertoto Cup: 2005

References

External links

foreign.peacefmonline.com
goal.com

1982 births
Living people
People from Bobigny
Footballers from Seine-Saint-Denis
Cameroonian footballers
Cameroon international footballers
French footballers
French sportspeople of Cameroonian descent
Citizens of Cameroon through descent
France under-21 international footballers
Association football goalkeepers
Red Star F.C. players
RC Lens players
Liverpool F.C. players
Kavala F.C. players
Atromitos F.C. players
PAOK FC players
Konyaspor footballers
Çaykur Rizespor footballers
Gaziantepspor footballers
Adanaspor footballers
FC Versailles 78 players
Ligue 1 players
Super League Greece players
Süper Lig players
Championnat National 3 players
2014 FIFA World Cup players
Cameroonian expatriate footballers
French expatriate footballers
Expatriate footballers in England
Expatriate footballers in Greece
Expatriate footballers in Turkey
Cameroonian expatriate sportspeople in England
Cameroonian expatriate sportspeople in Greece
Cameroonian expatriate sportspeople in Turkey
French expatriate sportspeople in England
French expatriate sportspeople in Greece
French expatriate sportspeople in Turkey